Johannes Gorantla (born 1952 in Managalapalli; died in 2007) was an Indian clergyman and prelate for the Roman Catholic Diocese of Kurnool. He was appointed bishop in 1993. He died in 2007.

References 

1952 births
2007 deaths
Indian Roman Catholic bishops